The Juno Awards of 1975, representing Canadian music industry achievements of the previous year, were awarded on 24 March 1975 in Toronto at a ceremony in the Canadian National Exhibition. Paul Anka was host for the ceremonies, which were broadcast for the first time. Canadians were able to see the event on CBC Television from 10pm Eastern Time.

Stompin' Tom Connors, Susan Jacks, Terry Jacks, Andy Kim, Anne Murray, and The Stampeders would appear at the ceremonies.

With the move to television, control over the Junos had shifted from Walt Grealis' RPM Magazine to the new Canadian Music Awards Association. Grealis was now in an advisory role for the Junos, and according to The Globe and Mail his founding role was not acknowledged during the Junos broadcast.

Nominees and winners

Female Vocalist of the Year
Winner: Anne Murray

Other nominees:
 Alexis Radlin
 Patsy Gallant
 Susan Jacks
 Cathy Young

Male Vocalist
Winner: Gordon Lightfoot

Most Promising Female Vocalist of the Year
Winner: Suzanne Stevens
 Alexis Radlin
 Charity Brown
 Debbie Fleming

Most Promising Male Vocalist of the Year
Winner: Gino Vannelli
 Bill King
 Justin Paige
 Keath Barrie
 Paul Hann

Group of the Year
Winner: Bachman–Turner Overdrive

Most Promising Group of the Year
 Rush
Beau Dommage
Greaseball Boogie Band
Mahogany Rush
Ville Émard Blues Band

Composer of the Year
Winner: Paul Anka

Country Female Vocalist of the Year
Winner: Anne Murray

Country Male Vocalist of the Year
Winner: Stompin' Tom Connors

Country Group or Duo of the Year
Winner: Carlton Showband

Folk Singer of the Year
Winner: Gordon Lightfoot

Producer of the Year
Winner: Randy Bachman

Nominated and winning albums

Best Selling Album
Winner: Not Fragile, Bachman–Turner Overdrive

Best Album Graphics
Winner: Bart Schoales, Night Vision by Bruce Cockburn

Best Selling International Album
Winner: Band on the Run, Paul McCartney

Nominated and winning releases

Best Selling Single
Winner: "Seasons in the Sun", Terry Jacks
Paul Anka, "You're Having My Baby"
Bachman–Turner Overdrive, "You Ain't Seen Nothing Yet"
Andy Kim, "Rock Me Gently"
Wednesday, "Last Kiss"

Best Selling International Single
Winner: "The Night Chicago Died", Paper Lace

References

External links
Juno Awards site

1975
1975 music awards
1975 in Canadian music